Kembs is a commune in the Haut-Rhin department in Alsace in north-eastern France. It was founded during Roman times as the city of Cambete.

Population

See also
 Communes of the Haut-Rhin département

References

Communes of Haut-Rhin